Luca Paolo Eugenio Regli (born 1962) is a neurosurgeon and full professor and chairman of the Department of Neurosurgery of the University Hospital of Zürich since October 2012.

Career
Regli studied medicine at the University of Lausanne and worked at the (Lausanne University Hospital) where he trained under . In 1991, Regli continued his specialization at the Mayo Clinic (Rochester, Minnesota, USA), forming his expertise in the microsurgical treatment of complex intracranial lesions. He obtained his board certification in neurosurgery and worked alongside David G. Piepgras.

In 1993, Regli visited Phoenix to learn from Robert F. Spetzler. In early 1994, he returned to Lausanne until 2008 where he was gradually promoted to professor and chairman. In 2008, Regli was called as full professor and chairman of neurosurgery at the University Medical Center Utrecht (The Netherlands). He worked with Elana, which develops and manufactures medical devices for brain bypass surgery and is now part of Brain Technology Institute, a non-profit organization  located in the Netherlands focusing on research and technology development for combating neurosurgical diseases, of which he has been a board member since it was founded in 2013.

In 2012, the University of Zurich nominated him as professor and chair of the Department of Neurosurgery of the University Hospital of Zürich, which is an international reference center for cerebrovascular diseases, neuro-oncology, and functional neurosurgery.

Regli's research interests involve clinical questions in the domain of cerebral ischemia, cerebral metabolism, cerebral homeostasis, and edema, as well as surgical techniques for cerebral revascularization and intra-operative imaging.

Published works
Regli has authored or co-authored over 250 peer-reviewed journal publications and 18 book chapters, including as editor of neurosurgical textbooks. Regli's Google Scholar profile shows that his work has been cited over 13,000 times, giving him an h-index of 48.

Selected articles and chapters

Books

References

1962 births
Living people
Swiss neurosurgeons
Academic staff of the University of Zurich
University of Lausanne alumni
Scientists from Zürich